Zehak is a city in and the capital of Zehak County, Sistan and Baluchestan Province, Iran. At the 2006 census, its population was 11,180, in 2,297 families.

References

Populated places in Zehak County

Cities in Sistan and Baluchestan Province